Nicholas or Nick Morris or Morys may refer to:

Nick Morris, filmmaker
Nick Morris (basketball)
Nicholas Morys, MP for Cambridgeshire
Nicolas Morice, navy officer
Nick Morris (speedway rider) (born 1994), Australian racer

See also 
Nicky Morris (born 1962), English middle and long-distance runner
Nicola Morris (born 1967), New Zealand Olympic judoka